The California Quadrangle, California Building, and California Tower are historic structures located in Balboa Park in San Diego, California. They were built for the 1915–16 Panama-California Exposition and served as the grand entry to the Expo. The buildings and courtyard were designed by architect Bertram Goodhue. They were added to the National Register of Historic Places on May 17, 1974. They now house the Museum of Us.

The Quadrangle includes the California Building and Tower on the north side, and Evernham Hall and the St. Francis Chapel on the south side. Between them is an open space linked by arcaded passageways and massive arched gateways to form the Plaza de California. The original Balboa Park Administration Building (now the Gill Administration Building) lies just outside the Quadrangle, adjacent to and west of the California Building. Unlike most of the exhibits at the Expo, the Quadrangle buildings were intended to be permanent.

The Plaza de California is the main entryway to Balboa Park, approached over the Cabrillo Bridge. That entry is currently a two-lane road providing vehicle access to the park. The city approved plans to divert vehicle traffic away from the Plaza de California and restore it as a pedestrian-only promenade, hoping to complete the project in time to celebrate the 2015 centennial of the Exposition. However, the plan was challenged in court and was overturned by a judge on February 4, 2013, on the grounds that the city had not followed its own Municipal Code requirements in approving it.

California Building and Tower
The California Building with its ornate facade and blue-and-gold dome, together with the adjoining California Tower, are among the most recognizable landmarks in San Diego. They house the Museum of Us. The design and ornamentation combine many style elements including Gothic, Plateresque, Baroque, Churrigueresque, and Rococo to create the impression of a Spanish Colonial church. The dome's design looked to the dome at the Church of Santa Prisca and San Sebastián in Taxco, Mexico. The great central dome is encircled with the inscription "Terram Frumenti Hordei, ac Vinarum, in qua Ficus et Malogranata et Oliveta Nascuntur, Terram Olei ac Mellis", (A land of wheat, and barley, and vines, and fig-trees, and pomegranates; a land of oil olive, and honey), (Deuteronomy 8:8 taken from the Vulgate of St. Jerome; see also the Seven Species), as well as the California motto, "Eureka".

The building's facade features stone ornamentation as well as many historical figures and busts sculpted from modeling clay and plaster, depicting prominent people from California, England, Mexico, and Spain. These include Junípero Serra, Philip III of Spain, Sebastián Vizcaíno, George Vancouver, Luís Jayme, Carlos III of Spain, Juan Rodríguez Cabrillo, Gaspar de Portolà, and Antonio de la Ascención. The facade also features the shield of the United States and the coats of arms of California and Mexico.

The tower's design is Spanish while the details and color are Mexican in style. The tower is composed of three tiers that shift from a quadrangle to an octagon and then a circle. There is a Maas-Rowe carillon in the tower, first installed in 1946 and replaced in 1967. The carillon can be heard throughout the park. It plays the Westminster Chimes every quarter-hour, and a resident carillonneur plays three songs at noon every day. The tower has been described as "San Diego's Icon," the most photographed and best-known landmark in San Diego.

The State of California paid the $250,000 cost to develop the California Building and Tower for the 1915 Exposition. Although California owned the building, it was turned over to the San Diego government in 1926. During the Exposition the California Building was the home of the Expo's theme exhibit, an anthropological display called "The Story of Man through the Ages." After the Expo ended, the exhibit was retained and expanded, eventually becoming the Museum of Us.

Fine Arts Building
On the south side of the Quadrangle is the fair's original Fine Arts Building (not to be confused with the Fine Arts Gallery, which opened in 1926 and is now the San Diego Museum of Art). The building is now used by the Museum of Us. It houses a banquet hall called Evernham Hall, and is also used for temporary exhibits.

St. Francis Chapel
The St. Francis Chapel is a small chapel in Mission style, built to add a religious note to the Expo. The interior design is simple except for an elaborately decorated and gilded Spanish-style altar. To the right of the carved statue of Our Lady and Child is an effigy representing San Diego de Alcala, name-saint of the city, and to commemorate the early Jesuit missions in Arizona on the left is an unknown Jesuit saint. The chapel is not generally open to the public but is available for private events such as weddings and commitment ceremonies. It was used as a military chapel during World War II.

Administration Building
Just outside the California Quadrangle, on the west, is the first building visitors encounter as they cross the Cabrillo Bridge and enter the El Prado Complex. This is the Administration Building. It was constructed in Balboa Park as the Panama-California Exposition Administration Building, completed in 1911 and designed by Irving Gill. Gill designed the building in his high style. This style is sometimes called Mission style, but that is an incorrect label as it bears very little resemblance to the California Missions. After Gill left the Exposition project, the design was augmented with the Bertram Goodhue style of Spanish Colonial ornamentation in an attempt to match the architectural theme of the rest of the Exposition. The building contained numerous large offices and an auditorium. It served as the planning and administrative headquarters for the 1915-16 Exposition, as well as a place for international receptions. During World War II it was used as a military hospital. For many years after that the building was vacant, and the city proposed to tear it down in 1978, but it was eventually restored in the 1990s (sans ornamentation) and turned over to the Museum of Us. Today it is known as the Gill Administration Building and houses the administrative offices of the Museum of Us. It is the only building still in Balboa park that bears Gill's signature style.

Map
This is a schematic map of the Panama-California Exposition as it appeared in its second year, 1916. The California Quadrangle is the blue area on the left side of the map.

References

History of San Diego
Balboa Park (San Diego)
Bertram Goodhue buildings
Irving Gill buildings
Spanish Colonial Revival architecture in California
World's fair architecture in California